The 1970 Stockholm Open was a tennis tournament played on hard courts and part of the 1970 Pepsi-Cola Grand Prix and took place in Stockholm, Sweden. The tournament was held from November 1 through November 7, 1970. Arthur Ashe and Stan Smith won in the final by defeating Bob Carmichael and Owen Davidson, 6–0, 5–7, 7–5.

Seeds

  Ken Rosewall /  Roy Emerson (first round)
  Arthur Ashe /  Stan Smith (champions)

Draw

Main draw

References

1970 Doubles
1970 Grand Prix (tennis)